James McConnell "Mac" Anderson (August 9, 1907 in New Orleans – April 3, 1998 in Jackson County, Mississippi) was an American painter, muralist, and pottery designer and decorator, youngest of the three brothers (along with Walter Inglis Anderson and founder Peter Anderson) who collaborated at Shearwater Pottery, Ocean Springs, Mississippi.

Early life and education 

Born in New Orleans, Anderson was the third and youngest son of Annette McConnell and George Walter Anderson. He attended military boarding school, (Isidore Newman School) and in Chattanooga (The McCallie School), graduating in 1926. He studied architecture at Tulane University with William Spratling from 1926 until 1928, before devoting himself to the family business.

Art and business career 

Anderson's brother Peter opened the Shearwater Pottery Factory in Ocean Springs, Mississippi in 1928, on a 24-acre parcel of property his parents had purchased in 1918. In 1929 Anderson and his brother Walter built an extension adjacent to Peter's factory. The brothers began working at the Annex in 1930. Anderson made molds, fired the products, and supervised Shearwater's production.

In Shearwater's third year of existence (1931), he joined his brother Walter ("Bob") in a new business venture, "the Shearwater Annex", where, over the years, the two of them designed and produced inexpensive decorative objects ranging from sets of ceramic baseball and football players, to humorous figurines of Southern blacks and legendary pirates, to lamp bases, and smaller objects called "widgets", which "filled spaces in the kiln under the larger pieces to increase the value of the firing" (Lebow, "James McConnell Anderson"). Characteristic pieces included the baseball player series, woodpecker mugs, small fish and animals (Patti Carr Black, p. 200). The figurines, which appealed to Gulf Coast tourists, received national publicity in the early 1930s and helped Shearwater survive the Depression. 

More important to Anderson's artistic legacy were his meticulously decorated vases and bowls, several of which won recognition in the Robineau competition at Syracuse University); his ceramic murals, done with his brother Peter, for the Ocean Springs Public School under the auspices of the Public Works of Art Project (1934) and, beginning in the 1940s, his oil paintings, fabric designs, block prints, and private and public murals.

== Shipbuilding ==
Unable to devote himself full-time to his art, in the early 1940s, he began working for Ingalls Shipbuilding, Pascagoula, Mississippi, as a "straightener" and later at Delta Shipyard, New Orleans, as straightener and pusher (it was his job to flatten and straighten the metal plates used in shipbuilding, an "awe-inspiring job," he once joked. "When you’ve got a blow torch in one hand and a stream of water in the other, people tend to get along with you!" (Lebow).

New Orleans art career 
During his time in New Orleans, "Mac" Anderson painted and took biweekly classes  at the Arts and Crafts Club, in New Orleans, where he studied under Uruguayan artist Juan José Calandria.

Personal life 
In 1946 he married Sara Lemon of Ocean Springs, who had begun working at Shearwater in 1936 and who continued working in the showroom. On returning to Shearwater he renovated the Annex, installed a new kiln and other equipment, and designed new figurines and widgets.

His daughters, Marti and Adele were born in 1947 and 1951, respectively.

Adele Anderson Lawton 
Years later, Adele Anderson Lawton worked as a decorator at Shearwater and as painter of the linoleum block prints cut by her uncle Walter Anderson (Carr, p. 201) as well as the silk screens made from those prints; assisted her father with the reproduction of his graphic works; and developed a family store in Ocean Springs "featuring fabrics, clothing and prints of Walter Anderson's designs". In 2006, Adele resumed her work at Shearwater Pottery as a decorator and painter, and is now actively involved with the restoration of Mac's work that was damaged in Katrina.

Technician in optics 
In 1952, Mac went to work as a technician at Ferson Optics in Ocean Springs, where, for the next twenty years, he corrected prisms for gun sites and tanks and collaborated, in the early 1970s, on the optics used in one of NASA's Mars shots.

Murals 
During the 1950s, he also created a number of murals in homes and businesses in Ocean Springs, and in surrounding areas. Many are now lost. One of the largest was the .long "Scene of the Singing River" (1959) painted on canvas and affixed to the walls of the waiting room in the Singing River Hospital, Pascagoula. Retrieved by local historians Tom Wixon and Ray Bellande from a hospital storeroom in 1999, the mural was restored and reinstalled in the Jackson County Courthouse, Pascagoula. Another large mural (11' x 20'), inspired by Anderson but much later in date, adorns the entrance to the Ocean Springs Civic Center.

Art after retirement 
After his retirement in 1972, Anderson was able to devote himself more fully to his art and spent the remaining decades of his life at Shearwater, painting, decorating pottery, and making prints. Anderson's work drew its inspiration from the flora, fauna, and characteristic figures of the Gulf Coast (oyster tongers, hunters, flounderers), and from the African-American community of New Orleans. Instinct with "order, quietness, and beauty" (in the words of Mary Anderson Pickard) his oil paintings were done on masonite rather than canvas. As he told an interviewer, "I liked the idea of making any size you wanted just by taking the saw to it" (Lebow).

Retrospective of 1992 
A retrospective exhibition was staged in January 1992 at the Walter Anderson Museum of Art. In the museum's archives is a video recording of his remarks, on that occasion, about his own life and works. In 2005, Hurricane Katrina destroyed the unique rammed-earth house and studio Anderson had ingeniously constructed at Shearwater in 1937, severely damaging the family's collection of his art works, which now awaits restoration.

See also 

Dreaming in Clay
Christopher Maurer and Maria Estrella Iglesias, Dreaming in Clay on the Coast of Mississippi: Art and Love at Shearwater (Doubleday, 2001)
Dod Stewart, Shearwater Pottery (privately printed, 2006); bibliography cited in Walter Inglis Anderson
Patti Carr Black, Art in Mississippi, 1720-1980 (University Press of Mississippi, 1998)  *Jeanne Lebow, In Praise of James McConnell 'Mac' Anderson, Biloxi Sun Herald (date unknown)

References

1907 births
1998 deaths
20th-century American painters
American male painters
American muralists
Artists from New Orleans
People from Ocean Springs, Mississippi
Public Works of Art Project artists
20th-century American male artists